Pteroteinon is an Afrotropical genus of grass skipper butterflies in the family Hesperiidae.

Species
Pteroteinon caenira (Hewitson, 1867)
Pteroteinon capronnieri (Plötz, 1879)
Pteroteinon ceucaenira (Druce, 1910)
Pteroteinon concaenira Belcastro & Larsen, 1996
Pteroteinon iricolor (Holland, 1890)
Pteroteinon laterculus (Holland, 1890)
Pteroteinon laufella (Hewitson, 1868)
Pteroteinon pruna Evans, 1937

References

External links
Natural History Museum Lepidoptera genus database
Seitz, A. Die Gross-Schmetterlinge der Erde 13: Die Afrikanischen Tagfalter. Plate XIII 80

Erionotini
Hesperiidae genera